This is a list of Members of Parliament (MPs) in the Second Protectorate Parliament under the Commonwealth of England which began at Westminster on 17 September 1656, and was held until 4 February 1658.

This list contains details of the MPs elected in 1656. The preceding First Protectorate Parliament had excluded a number of Rotten Borough and given representation to several towns including Manchester, Leeds and Halifax and to the county and city of Durham. The Second Protectorate Parliament consisted of the same seats as its predecessor

List of constituencies and MPs

See also
List of MPs elected to the English parliament in 1654 (First Protectorate Parliament)
List of MPs elected to the English parliament in 1659 (Third Protectorate Parliament)
Second Protectorate Parliament

Notes

References

17th-century English parliaments
1656
 
1656 in England
1656 in politics
 List
The Protectorate